Newton is an unincorporated community in Roane County, West Virginia, United States. Newton has a post office with ZIP code 25266.

The community was named after Isaac Newton Ross, the child of an early postmaster.

References

Unincorporated communities in Roane County, West Virginia